This is a complete list of current bridges and other crossings of the Kanawha River, and its continuation the New River, from its mouth at the Ohio River to the split between the North and South Forks of the New River.  Pedestrian-only bridges are marked in italics.

West Virginia

Virginia and North Carolina 
All locations are in Virginia unless otherwise specified

References 

Kanawha River
New River (Kanawha River tributary)
Lists of river crossings in the United States